José Manuel Abdalá de la Fuente (15 June 1957 – 10 July 2014) was a Mexican journalist and politician affiliated with the Institutional Revolutionary Party. He served as Deputy of the LIX Legislature of the Mexican Congress representing Tamaulipas.

References

1957 births
2014 deaths
People from Nuevo Laredo
20th-century Mexican journalists
Male journalists
Members of the Chamber of Deputies (Mexico) for Tamaulipas
Institutional Revolutionary Party politicians
Deputies of the LIX Legislature of Mexico